Big Momma may refer to:

Film	
Big Momma's House, a 2000 American crime comedy film directed by Raja Gosnell

People
Big Momma, a hip hop artist
Idalia Ramos Rangel, also known as "Big Momma", a suspected drug lord

See also
Big Mama (disambiguation)